The 2015 Castrol Edge Townsville 400 was a motor race for V8 Supercars held on the weekend of 10–12 July 2015. It was the sixth round of fourteen in the 2015 International V8 Supercars Championship.

Results

Race 16

Race 17

References

Townsville
July 2015 sports events in Australia